Brandt's mountain finch (Leucosticte brandti), also known as the black-headed mountain-finch, is a species of finch in the family Fringillidae.
It is found in Afghanistan, Bhutan, China, India, Kazakhstan, Nepal, Pakistan, Russia, Tajikistan, and Turkmenistan.
Its natural habitat is temperate grassland.

References

Brandt's mountain finch
Birds of Mongolia
Birds of the Himalayas
Birds of Central Asia
Birds of Tibet
Brandt's mountain finch
Brandt's mountain finch
Taxonomy articles created by Polbot